Aulstad Church is a parish church of the Church of Norway in Gausdal Municipality in Innlandet county, Norway. It is located in the village of Aulstad. It is the church for the Aulstad parish which is part of the Sør-Gudbrandsdal prosti (deanery) in the Diocese of Hamar. The white, wooden church was built in a long church design in 1864 using plans drawn up by an unknown architect. The church seats about 150 people.

The church can be reached via Norwegian County Road 255. There is a cemetery next to the church.

History

In the 1860s, the parish received permission to build a new church in Aulstad. The old Svatsum Church had been torn down in 1860, and many of the materials were reused in the construction of the new Aulstad Church. Construction on the new church took place in 1864. The new church was a small long church with a choir and small sacristy on the east end of the nave. There was a small church porch with a tower on the west end of the nave. Some of the furnishings from the old Svatsum Church were also transferred to the new church including the altar and a wooden carving by Eistein Kjørn. The new church was consecrated in 1864.

See also
List of churches in Hamar

References

Further reading

External links
 Aulstad Church at the Church of Norway website
 Aulstad Church at Kirkesøk
 Aulstad Church at the Directorate for Cultural Heritage website

Gausdal
Churches in Innlandet
Churches in Sør-Gudbrandsdal Deanery
Long churches in Norway
Wooden churches in Norway
19th-century Church of Norway church buildings
Churches completed in 1864
1864 establishments in Norway